USS Endurance (AM-435/MSO-435) was an Agile-class minesweeper in service with the United States Navy from 1954 to 1972. She was scrapped in 1974.

History
The second ship to be named Endurance by the Navy, AM-435 was launched 8 August 1952 by J. M. Martinac Shipbuilding Corp., Tacoma, Washington; sponsored by Miss Gerry A. Borovich; and commissioned 19 May 1954. She was reclassified MSO-435 on 7 February 1955.

On 21 April 1954, Endurance arrived at Long Beach, California, her home port, and began training operations along the southern coast of California. In July 1955 she made a good will cruise to Acapulco, Mexico, returning to local duty on exercises, drills, and operations with ships of other types.

Endurance made her first cruise to the Far East between August 1957 and February 1958, during which she exercised with ships of the Japanese Maritime Self Defense Force and the navy of the Republic of China. Her second tour of duty in the Far East, from January through July 1960, included minesweeping exercises at Okinawa, and another period of assistance to the Chinese navy in developing their modern mine warfare techniques. Arriving at Long Beach on 19 July, the remainder of the year was given to operations and ship overhaul.

On 13 Jun 1969, in Subic Bay, Philippines, USS Endurance was accidentally rammed by a Royal Navy submarine, HMS Rorqual (S02) with minor damage.

Endurance was stricken 1 July 1972 and disposed of by Navy sale December 1973.

References

External links

 NavSource Online: Mine Warfare Vessel Photo Archive - Endurance (MSO-435) - ex-AM-435
 USS Endurance (MSO-435) website

 

Agile-class minesweepers
Ships built in Tacoma, Washington
1952 ships